The M1903 Springfield, officially the United States Rifle, Caliber .30-06, Model 1903, is an American five-round magazine-fed, bolt-action service repeating rifle, used primarily during the first half of the 20th century.

The M1903 was first used in combat during the Philippine–American War, and it was officially adopted by the United States as the standard infantry rifle on June 19, 1903, where it saw service in World War I, and was replaced by the faster-firing semi-automatic eight-round M1 Garand starting in 1936. However, the M1903 remained in service as a standard issue infantry rifle during World War II, since the U.S. entered the war without sufficient M1 rifles to arm all troops. It also remained in service as a sniper rifle during World War II, the Korean War, and the Vietnam War. It remains popular as a civilian firearm, historical collector's piece, a competitive shooting rifle, and as a military drill rifle.

History

Background
During the 1898 war with Spain, the Mauser M1893 used by the Spanish Army gained a deadly reputation, particularly from the Battle of San Juan Hill, where 750 Spanish regulars significantly delayed the advance of 15,000 US troops armed with outclassed Springfield Krag–Jørgensen bolt-action rifles and older single-shot Springfield trapdoor rifles. The Spanish soldiers inflicted 1,400 casualties on the US in a matter of minutes. Likewise, earlier in the day, a Spanish force of 540 regulars armed with the same Mauser rifles, under Spanish general Vara Del Rey, held off General Henry Ware Lawton's Second Division of 6,653 American soldiers and an independent brigade of 1,800 men for ten hours in the nearby town of El Caney, keeping that division from assisting in the attack on the San Juan Heights. A US Army board of investigation was commissioned as a direct result of both battles. They recommended replacement of the Krag.

The 1903 adoption of the M1903 was preceded by nearly 30 years of struggle and politics, using lessons learned from the recently adopted Krag–Jørgensen and contemporary German Mauser Gewehr 98 bolt-action rifles. The design itself is largely based on the Mauser M1893 and its successive models up to the Gewehr 98 rifle. The US military licensed many of the Mauser Company's and other German patents, including the spitzer bullet, later modified into the .30-06 Springfield. The M1903 not only replaced the various versions of the U.S. Army's Krag, but also the Lee M1895 and M1885 Remington–Lee used by the United States Navy and the United States Marine Corps, as well as all remaining single-shot trapdoor rifles. While the Krag had been issued with barrel lengths of both  30-inch rifle and 22-inch carbine models, the Springfield was issued only as a short 24-inch-barrel rifle in keeping with current trends in Switzerland and Great Britain to eliminate the need for both long rifles and carbines.

The two main problems usually cited with the Krag were its slow-to-load magazine and its inability to handle higher chamber pressures for high-velocity rounds. The United States Army attempted to introduce a higher-velocity cartridge in 1899 for the existing Krags, but its single locking lug on the bolt could not withstand the extra chamber pressure. Though a stripper-clip or charger loading modification to the Krag was designed, it was clear to Army authorities that a new rifle was required. After the U.S. military's experience with the Mauser rifle in the 1898 Spanish–American War, authorities decided to adopt a stronger Mauser-derived bolt-action design equipped with a charger- or stripper clip-loaded box magazine.

Advances in small arms technology
In 1882, the bolt action Remington Lee rifle design of 1879, with its newly invented detachable box magazine, was purchased in limited numbers by the U.S. Navy. Several hundred M1882 Lee Navy models (M1882 Remington-Lee) were also subjected to trials by the U.S. Army during the 1880s, though the rifle was not formally adopted. The Navy adopted the M1885, and later different style Lee M1895 (a 6 mm straight pull bolt), which saw service in the Boxer Rebellion. In Army service, both the M1885 and M1895 6 mm Lee were used in the Spanish–American War, along with the .30-40 Krag and the .45-70. The Lee rifle's detachable box magazine was invented by James Paris Lee, and was very influential on later rifle designs. Other advancements had made it clear that the Army needed a replacement. In 1892, the U.S. military held a series of rifle trials, resulting in the adoption of the .30-40 Krag–Jørgensen rifle. The Krag officially entered U.S. service in 1894, only to be replaced nine years later by the M1903.

Development
Thousands of Spanish Mauser M1893 rifles, surrendered by Spanish troops in Cuba, were returned to the US and extensively studied at Springfield Armory, where it was decided that the Mauser was the superior design.

U.S. rifle Model 1900 .30 prototype
A prototype rifle was produced in 1900; it was very similar to rifle No. 5, the final Mauser M92 prototype in the U.S. Army rifle trials of 1892. This design was rejected, and a new design combining features of the M1898 Krag rifle and the Spanish Mauser M1893 was developed.

U.S. rifle Model 1901 .30 prototype
Springfield began work on creating a rifle that could handle higher loads around the turn of the 20th century. The Springfield Model 1901 prototype combined the cock-on-opening bolt, 30-inch barrel, magazine cutoff, stock and sights of the Krag–Jørgensen with the dual locking lugs, external claw extractor, and staggered-column magazine of the Mauser M1893. Taking a cue from the Mauser Gewehr 98, a large safety lug was added to the side of the bolt behind the extractor, which engaged the receiver bridge and prevented the bolt from moving rearwards. The bolt handle was also bent downwards, to make operation of the bolt faster. The Model 1901 almost entered production. Springfield was sure enough that the Model 1901 prototype would be accepted that they began making some parts, but it was not accepted and further changes were asked for.

Adoption
Following then-current trends in service rifles, the barrel was shortened to 24 inches after it was discovered that a longer barrel offered no appreciable ballistic advantage, and the shorter barrel was lighter and easier to handle. This "short rifle" also eliminated the need of a shorter carbine for mounted troops or cavalry. A spike-type bayonet with storage in the forend of the stock was added to the design. This new design was accepted, type classified and officially adopted as the United States Rifle, Caliber .30, Model 1903 and entered production in 1903. The M1903 became commonly known among its users as the "ought-three" in reference to the year, 1903, of first production.

Despite Springfield Armory's use of a two-piece firing pin and other slight design alterations, the M1903 was, in fact, a Mauser design, and after that company brought suit, the U.S. government was judged to pay $250,000 in royalties to Mauser Werke.

By January 1905, over 80,000 of these rifles had been produced at the federally-owned Springfield Armory. However, President Theodore Roosevelt objected to the design of the sliding rod-type bayonet used as being too flimsy for combat.  In a letter to the secretary of war, he said:

I must say that I think that ramrod bayonet is about as poor an invention as I ever saw.  As you observed, it broke short off as soon as hit with even moderate violence. It would have no moral effect and mighty little physical effect.

All the rifles to that point consequently had to be re-tooled for a blade-type bayonet, called the "M1905". The sights were also an area of concern, so the new improved Model 1904 sight was also added.

The retooling was almost complete when it was decided another change would be made. It was to incorporate improvements discovered during experimentation in the interim, most notably the use of pointed ammunition, first adopted by the French in the 1890s and later other countries. The new American cartridge was designated Cartridge, Ball, Caliber .30, Model of 1906. The M1906 cartridge is better known as the .30-06 Springfield round, used in many rifles and machine guns, and is still a popular civilian cartridge to the present day. The rifle's sights were again re-tooled to compensate for the speed and trajectory of the new cartridge.

By the time of the 1916 Pancho Villa Expedition, the M1903 was the standard issue service rifle of US forces. Some rifles were fitted with both the Warner & Swasey Model 1913 and 1908 "musket sights" during the campaign, "musket sights" being the vernacular at the time for telescopic sights. Anecdotal evidence at the time indicates that some of the rifles were fitted with Maxim suppressors, which would make them the first suppressed rifles used by the US military. The Warner & Swasey Model 1913 musket sight continued to see service after the Pancho Villa Expedition and during World War I but was eventually deemed inadequate and was removed from the US Army's inventory by the 1920s.

World War I and interwar use

By the time of US entry into World War I, 843,239 M1903 rifles had been produced at Springfield Armory and Rock Island Arsenal. Pre-war production utilized questionable metallurgy. Some receivers constructed of single-heat-treated case-hardened steel were improperly subjected to excessive temperatures during the forging process. The carbon could be "burnt" out of the steel, producing a brittle receiver. Despite documented evidence indicating some early rifles were improperly forged, actual cases of failure were very rare. Although several cases of serious injury from receiver failure were documented, the U.S. Army never reported any fatalities. Many failures were attributed to use of incorrect cartridges, such as the 7.92×57mm Mauser. Evidence also seems to suggest that improperly forged brass cartridge cases could have exacerbated receiver failure.

Pyrometers were installed in December 1917 to accurately measure temperatures during the forging process. The change was made at approximately serial number 800,000 for rifles made at Springfield Armory and at serial number 285,507 at Rock Island Arsenal. Lower serial numbers are known as "low-number" M1903 rifles. Higher serial numbers are said to be "double-heat-treated".

Toward the end of the war, Springfield turned out the Model 1903 Mark I. The Mark I has a cut on the left hand side of the receiver meant to act as an ejection port for the Pedersen device, a modified sear and cutoff to operate the Pedersen device; a specialized insert that replaced the bolt and allowed the user to fire .30 caliber pistol cartridges semi-automatically from a 40-round detachable magazine. The stock was also slightly cut down on the left side to clear the ejection port. In all other respects, the Mark I is identical to the M1903. Temperature control during forging was improved prior to Mark I production. The receiver alloy was toughened by addition of nickel after Mark I production.

In 1926, after experiencing the effect of long-range German 7.92×57mm rifle and machine gun fire during the war, the U.S. Army adopted the heavy, 174-grain, boat-tail bullet for its .30-06 cartridge, standardized as Cartridge, Ball, caliber 30, M1. M1 ammunition, intended primarily for long-range machine gun use, soon became known by Army rifle competition teams and expert riflemen for its considerably greater accuracy over that of the M1906-round; the new M1 ammunition was issued to infantrymen with the Springfield rifle as well as to machine gun teams. However, during the late 1930s, it became apparent that, with the development of mortars, high-angle artillery, and the .50 caliber M2 Browning machine gun, the need for extreme long-range, rifle-caliber machine-gun fire was decreasing. In 1938, the US Army reverted to a .30-06 cartridge with a 152-grain flat-base bullet, now termed "M2 ball", for all rifles and machine guns.

In the 1920s and the 1930s, M1903s were delivered to US allies in Central America, such as Cuba, Costa Rica and Nicaragua. Costa Rica troops were equipped with Springfields during the Coto War and some rifles were captured by the opposing Panamanians. The Cuban Springfields were used by Batista forces after WW2 and later by the Revolutionary Armed Forces, for instance during the Bay of Pigs Invasion.

The Federal Bureau of Investigation acquired some M1903 rifles configured like National Rifle Association sporter models in response to the 1933 Kansas City Massacre.

In service, the Springfield was generally prized for its reliability and accuracy, though some problems remained. The precision rear aperture sight was located too far from the eye for efficient use, and the narrow, unprotected front sight was both difficult to see in poor light and easily damaged. The Marine Corps issued the Springfield with a sight hood to protect the front sight, along with a thicker front blade. The two-piece firing pin-striker also proved to be no improvement over the original one-piece Mauser design, and was a cause of numerous ordnance repairs, along with occasional reports of jammed magazine followers.

World War II
World War II saw new production of the Springfield at private manufacturers such as the Remington Arms and Smith-Corona Typewriter companies. Remington began production of the M1903 in September 1941, at serial number 3,000,000, using old tooling from the Rock Island Arsenal which had been in storage since 1919. The very early rifles are almost indistinguishable from 1919-made Rock Island rifles. As the already worn tooling began to wear beyond use Remington began seeking Army approval for a continuously increasing number of changes and simplifications to both speed up manufacture and improve performance. The milled parts on the Remington M1903 were gradually replaced with stamped parts until, at about serial number 3,330,000, the Army and Remington recognized that a new model name was appropriate. Other features of the M1903, such as high-grade walnut stocks with finger grooves, were replaced with less expensive but serviceable substitutes. Most milled parts made by Remington were marked with an "R".
 
Production of the M1903 was discontinued in favor of the M1903A3. The most noticeable visual difference in the M1903A3 was the replacement of the barrel-mounted rear sight with a smaller, simpler aperture rear sight mounted on the rear of the receiver which was designed by Remington; it was primarily adopted in order to speed familiarization by soldiers already trained on the M1 Garand, which had a similar sighting system. However, the leaf spring providing tension to the elevation adjustment on the new aperture sight tended to weaken with continued use over time, causing the rifle to lose its preset range elevation setting. Other modifications included a new stamped cartridge follower; the rounded edges of the new design largely alleviated the "fourth-round jam" complaints of the earlier machined part. All stock furniture was also redesigned in stamped metal.

In late 1942, Smith-Corona Typewriter Company  began production of the M1903A3 at its plant in Syracuse, New York. Smith-Corona parts are mostly identified by the absence of markings, except for occasions when time permitting during manufacture, on early to mid-production rifles, and also only on certain parts.

To speed up production output, two-groove rifled barrels were adopted, and steel alloy specifications were relaxed under "war emergency steel" criteria for both rifle actions and barrels. All M1903A3 rifles with two-groove "war emergency" barrels were shipped with a printed notation stating that the reduction in rifling grooves did not affect accuracy.  As the war progressed, various machining and finishing operations were eliminated on the M1903A3 in order to increase production levels.

Original production rifles at Remington and Smith-Corona had a dark gray-black finish similar to the bluing of late World War I. Beginning in late 1943 a lighter gray-green parkerizing finish was used. This later finish was also used on arsenal repaired weapons.

It is somewhat unusual to find a World War I or early World War II M1903 with its original dated barrel. Most, if not all, World War II .30-06 ammunition used a corrosive primer which left corrosive salts in the barrel. If not removed by frequent and proper barrel cleaning, these residues could cause pitting and excessive wear. In the jungle fighting on various Pacific islands cleaning was sometimes lax and the excessive moisture compounded the corrosive action of the residue.

The M1903 and the M1903A3 rifles were used in combat alongside the M1 Garand by the US military during World War II and saw extensive use and action in the hands of US troops in Europe, North Africa, and the Pacific. The US Marines were initially armed with M1903 rifles in early battles in the Pacific, such as the Battle of Guadalcanal, but the jungle battle environment generally favored self-loading rifles; later Army units arriving to the island were armed with M1 Garands. The U.S. Army Rangers were also a major user of the M1903 and the M1903A3 during World War II with the Springfield being preferred over the M1 Garand for certain commando missions. 

According to Bruce Canfield's U.S. Infantry Weapons of WW II, final variants of the M1903 (the A3 and A4) were delivered in February 1944. By then, most American combat troops had been re-equipped with the M1 Garand. However, some front-line infantry units in both the U.S. Army and Marine Corps retained M1903s as infantry rifles beyond that date and continued to use them alongside the M1 Garand until the end of the war in 1945. The Springfield remained in service for snipers (using the M1903A4), grenadiers (using a spigot type rifle 22 mm with the M1 grenade launcher] grenade launcher until the M7 grenade launcher was available for the M1 rifle in late 1943), and Marine scout sniper units.

Sniper rifle
The M1903A4 was the U.S. Army's sniper rifle of choice during the Second World War. The M1903A4 was a variation of the M1903A3. The only difference between receivers was that the model and serial number on the receiver were split on M1903A4 to make room for the Redfield scope mount. The Redfield scope mount removed the rear peep sight that was standard on the M1903A3. The scope used on the M1903A4 was a Weaver Model 330 or 330C, which was a 2.75x telescopic sight. The receivers were tested by Remington Arms and those that were deemed best, meaning those closest to design specifications were selected to become M1903A4's. The barrels were also selected specifically to be added to the M1903A4 rifle only if they were within almost exact specifications for the design. The front sight on the barrel was never installed on the A4 barrels, however, the notch for it was still in place. .  Barrel specifications were, in general, unchanged between the M1903A3 and M1903A4, however, the War Department did start installing barrels with 2 groove rifling instead of 4 groove, despite the lack of clear changes from the 4 groove rifling that was the standard up until 1942.

By some accounts, the M1903A4 was inadequate as a sniper rifle. The M1903A4 was a relatively accurate rifle with an effective range of about 600 yards (550m). These limitations on long-range targeting were due to the limited field of view present in both the Weaver scopes. From its adoption in 1943 until the end of the war it was used extensively in every theater of operation by both the US Army and the USMC. The Weaver scopes (later standardized as the M73 and M73B1) were not only low-powered in magnification, they were not waterproofed, and frequently fogged over or became waterlogged during humidity changes. In addition, the M81/82 optional scopes also had significant flaws. They most notably had less power (2.2x vs. 2.75x) and, like the other scopes on the M1903A4, had serious issues with the field of view. The USMC and the US Army would eventually switch to a large 8x scope that spanned the length of the rifle designed by John Unertl.

Foreign users
The US Army Military Police (MP) and the US Navy Shore Patrol also used M1903s and M1903A3s throughout the war. Various US allies and friendly irregular forces were also equipped with the weapon. The Brazilian Expeditionary Force (FEB), operating in the 5th Army in Italy was equipped with M1903 rifles. In August 1943, the Free French Forces of General Charles de Gaulle were re-equipped by the United States, primarily with M1903A3 Springfield and M1917 Enfield rifles. The M1903A3 became one of the primary rifles used by French forces until the end of the war, and was afterwards used  in Indochina and by local militia and security forces in French Algeria. Large numbers of M1903 rifles were sent to China.
During the Korean War, South Korean Marines used the M1903A3. 
The M1903 rifles captured by the Germans were designated Gewehr 249(a).

Post–Korean War service
After the Korean War, active service (as opposed to drill) use of the M1903 was rare. Still, some M1903A4s remained in sniper use as late as the Vietnam War; and technical manuals for them were printed as late as 1970. The U.S. Navy also continued to carry some stocks of M1903A3s on board ships for use as anti-mine rifles.

Today

Due to its balance, the M1903 is still popular with various military drill teams and color guards, most notably the U.S. Army Drill Team. M1903 rifles (along with the M1 Garand, M1917 Enfield and M14 rifles) are also common at high school Junior Reserve Officer Training Corps (JROTC) units to teach weapons handling and military drill procedures to the cadets. JROTC units use M1903s for regular and inter-school competition drills, including elaborate exhibition spinning routines. Exhibition teams often use fiberglass stocks in place of wooden stocks, which are heavier and more prone to breakage when dropped. JROTC Color Guards still favor wooden stocks over fiberglass because of their weight characteristics and appearance. The M1903 is the standard parade rifle of the Virginia Tech Corps of Cadets, which has over six hundred M1903s, a very small percentage of which are still fireable. The Summerall Guards of The Citadel also use the M1903 Springfield for their silent drill performances.

U.S. Naval Sea Cadet Corps color guard rifles bear many similarities to the Springfield.

In 1977, the Army located a rather large cache of unissued M1903A3 rifles which were demilitarized and then issued to JROTC units as a replacement for their previously issued M1 Garand and M14 rifles, which were then returned to Army custody due to concerns about potential break-ins at high school JROTC armories.

For safety reasons, the JROTC M1903s are made permanently unable to fire by plugging the barrel with a steel rod, or having it filled with lead, soldering the bolt and welding the magazine cutoff switch in the "on" position.  To plug the barrel, a very cold steel rod was inserted; after it warmed up it was too tight to remove.

Specifications

The US rifle, Model of 1903 is 44 inches (1.098 m) long and weighs 8 lb 11 oz (3.95 kg). A bayonet can be attached; the M1905 bayonet blade is 16 in (406 mm) long and weighs 1 lb (0.45 kg). From 1906, the rifle was chambered to fire the .30 caliber M1906 cartridge (.30-06 cartridge), later the M1 (1926) and M2 ball (1938) rounds. There were four standard types of cartridge:

 Ball: consists of a brass case or shell, primer, a charge of smokeless powder, and the bullet. The bullet has a sharp point called a spitzer, and is composed of a lead core and a jacket of cupro-nickel (later gilding metal), and in the M1906 design, weighs 150 grains (9.7 g).
 Blank: contains a paper cup instead of a bullet.
 Guard: has a smaller charge of powder than the ball cartridge, and five cannelures encircle the body of the shell at about the middle to distinguish it from ball cartridges.
 Dummy: this is tin-plated and the shell is provided with six longitudinal corrugations and three circular holes. The primer contains no percussion composition. It was intended for drill purposes to accustom the soldier to the operation of loading the rifle.

The rifle is a magazine-fed clip-loader and can fire at a rate of 20 shots per minute. Each stripper clip contains five cartridges, and standard issue consisted of 12 clips carried in a cloth bandoleer. Bandoleers were packed 20 in a box, for a total of 1,200 rounds. The full box weighs .

The bore of the rifle is 0.30 inches (7.62 mm) in diameter. It was then rifled 0.004 in (0.1 mm) deep, making the diameter from the bottom of one groove to the bottom of the opposite groove 0.30787 in (7.82 mm) of the barrel.

The M1903 rifle included a rear sight leaf that can be used to adjust for elevation and windage. This type of rear sight was previously designed by Adelbert R. Buffington of the U.S. Army Ordnance Department. The M1905 rear sight was calibated to match the trajectory of M1906 service ammunition and offers several sighting options. When the leaf and slider are down, the battle sight notch appears on top. The .30-06 Springfield  M1906 service ammunition long-range performance was originally overstated. When the M1906 cartridge was developed, the range tests had been done to only ; distances beyond that were estimated, but the estimate for extreme range was wrong by almost 40 percent. The external ballistic discrepancy at long-ranges became evident during World War I. The M1905 rear sight can also be adjusted for windage.

The M1903A3 introduced a  ramp-type rear aperture sight adjustable both for elevation and windage. This new sightline also lengthened the sight radius.

A feature inherent to the M1903 and not found on the Mauser M98 is the cocking piece, a conspicuous knob at the rear of the bolt, allowing the rifle's striker to be released without dry firing, or to cock the rifle if necessary, for example to attempt a second strike on a round that failed to fire.

Variants

There were four main variants given official nomenclature, though there are a number of important sub-variants:

M1903 (1903): developed for the .30-03 (also known as the .30-45) cartridge. Used original Type S stock.
M1903 bullpup (1903): experimental bullpup conversion for the USMC. 
M1903 (1905): changed from a rod type bayonet to the knife type Model 1905 bayonet and to the improved Model 1905 sight.
M1903 (1906):  modified again to specifically fire the new M1906 .30-06 cartridge ("ball cartridge, caliber 30, Model of 1906").
M1903 NRA (1915–1917): sold to National Rifle Association members and stamped "NRA" on the forward tang of the trigger guard.
M1903 air service (1918): issued to aircrew with permanent 25-round magazine and modified Type S stock forend designed as backup if a plane's machine gun jammed in combat.
M1903 Mark I (1918–1920): modified with an ejection port on the left side of the receiver for specific use with the Pedersen device.
M1903 NM (1921–1940): selected rifles produced at Springfield Armory for National Match shooting competition. Production barrels were measured with star-gauges, and those meeting specified tolerances were stamped with an asterisk shaped star on the muzzle crown. These barrels were fitted to selected receivers with hand-fitted and polished parts. The bolt was left unblued while the receiver and barrel were finished with a black Parkerizing process. Some bolts have the safety direction reversed to prevent it from striking the nose of a right-handed shooter and those made from 1924 to 1929 have the knurled cocking piece removed to decrease lock time. Early rifles used the type S stock until the type C stock became standard in 1929. Rifles made for sale to NRA members (priced at $40.44) were drilled and tapped for a Lyman 48 receiver sight and had either a type B (or NB) stock with no grasping grooves and a noticeable drop at the heel for a long pistol grip, or a special National Match stock with a high comb and pistol grip. Total production was 28,907. Most were issued to service teams and 25,377 were reconditioned at Springfield Armory after one year of match use. Reconditioned rifles have a large gas-escape port drilled into the left side of the receiver.
It was a training rifle and saw no action. After World War II most were dumped into the ocean and surviving pieces are rare.
M1903 with "scant" stock (1942): in late 1941, before the M1903A3 was standardized, Army ordnance wanted to standardize on a pistol-grip stock for all M1903 rifles. There were thousands of stock blanks that had been sized for the old straight stock. They were not deep enough for the full pistol grip of the Type C stock, so they were modified to allow a "scant" grip that was the largest grip they could form. These "scant" stocks would only fit on a M1903, and would not fit an 03A3. Springfield only rebuilt existing M1903 rifles using this stock in 1942 and marked the cut-off seat with a small "s".

M1903A1 (1929–1939): changed from a straight stock to a pistol grip type stock (Type C stock). The pistol grip stock was conducive to improved marksmanship and was fitted to National Match rifles until World War II. Pistol grip stocks became standard for later M1903 production and were subsequently fitted to older rifles. The Army considered any rifle with a pistol grip stock an M1903A1, but M1903 receiver markings were unchanged.
M1903A2 (1930s–1940s): basically a stripped A1 or A3 used as a subcaliber rifle with artillery pieces.
M1903A3 (1942–1944): sights were changed to an aperture (peep) system mounted on the receiver, and the rifle was modified for easier production with stamped metal parts and somewhat different grip and stock (late model Type S stock; no finger grooves).
M1903 (modified) (1941–1942): transition production of M1903 rifles by Remington Arms until the M1903A3 design was implemented involved modification of various parts creating a hybrid between the M1903 and M1903A3.
M1903A4 (1942): an M1903A3 modified to be a sniper rifle using an M73 or M73B1 2.5× Weaver telescopic sight and different stock, and omitting the iron sights. USMC versions instead used the 8x Unertl scope.

There are two main other types, various training types, and competition versions such as the National Match types. Aside from these there are some other civilian versions, experimental versions, and other miscellaneous types. Due to the duration of its service, there is also a range of smaller differences among ones from different periods and manufacturers.

In military use it was outnumbered by the M1917 Enfield for much of the war. Also, during World War II many remained in use early on, especially in the Pacific (generally replaced as M1s became available), in addition to service (along with other weapons) as a sniper rifle and to launch rifle grenades.

Bannerman Springfield: At the outbreak of World War I in 1914, the Scottish-born military surplus magnate, Francis Bannerman VI (1851–1918), assembled 1,000 M1903 rifles from surplus parts which were rebored to accept British .303 ammunition.  These he presented to the British Army together with the associated bayonets, pouches and webbing, as a patriotic gesture. However, the conversion was not a success and it was found that rimmed .303 cartridges would not feed properly from the magazine. The rifles were stamped "DP," i.e., fit for "drill purposes" only, and presented to the City of London Volunteer Training Corps who were otherwise without any weapons.

In popular culture
Ernest Hemingway used an M1903 to shoot big game, including lions, on his first African safari in 1933. His experiences during the safari is the subject of Green Hills of Africa, published in 1935.

An M1903A4 is used by Private Daniel Jackson in the film Saving Private Ryan.

Users

: Received after World War II.

 :Issued to Gendarmerie
 : Equipped with 2,083 M1903s in 1950.
  Italian Partisans: Supplied to partisans operating in the vicinity of American troops.
: Captured during World War II. Used by National Police Reserve after the war.

 : Used by the Netherlands Marine Corps during the Indonesian National Revolution.

 

 : Equipped with 216 M1903A3s before the Korean War. The number in service peaked at 3,611 in 1951, and was reduced to 393 by the end of the war. The military also received 100 and 109 M1903A4s in 1952 and 1953, respectively.

: Still in use with Junior ROTC units for ceremonial purposes.

See also
 Captured US firearms in Axis use in World War II
 Lee–Enfield rifle – Contemporary British Army rifle
 List of U.S. Army weapons by supply catalog designation
 Springfield M1922 – A cadet rifle, designed to mimic the M1903 Springfield rifle for training purposes
 Springfield rifle – For all other "Springfield" rifles

References

Citations

General sources 
 Ball, Robert W. D., Springfield Armory Shoulder Weapons 1795–1968.  Norfolk, VA: Antique Trader Books, 1997.  
 
 
 Engineer Field Manual, War Department, Document No. 355, 1909.
 Manual for Noncommissioned Officers and Privates of Infantry of the Army of the United States, War Department, Document No. 574, 1917.
 "Bushmaster '03 Carbine", American Rifle magazine, April 2005, p. 40.
 U.S. Infantry Weapons of World War II. Bruce N. Canfield, Andrew Mowbray Publishers, 1994.
 ''Operation Requirements for an Infantry Hand Weapon." Norman Hitchman, Operations Research Office, 1952

External links

 M1903.com
 FM 23-10 Basic Field Manual: U.S. Rifle Caliber .30, M1903, 20 September 1943
 (1943) TM 9-270 U.S. Rifle, Cal. .30, M1903A4 (Sniper's) Characteristics and Operation and Use of Telescopic Sight
 90th Infantry Division Preservation Group – Reference manual page including several M1903 manuals
 Account of Theodore Roosevelt's Safari: Springfield
 

.30-06 Springfield rifles
7.62 mm rifles
Bolt-action rifles of the United States
Cold War firearms of the United States
Rifles of the Cold War
Sniper rifles of the United States
Springfield firearms
Weapons of the Philippine Army
World War I infantry weapons of the United States
World War II firearms of the United States
World War II rifles
Weapons and ammunition introduced in 1903